The Ferrandaise is an endangered French breed of domestic cattle from the département of Puy-de-Dôme, in the Massif Central mountains of Auvergne, in central France. It is named for the city and commune of Clermont-Ferrand, the capital of Puy-de-Dôme.

History 

Although cattle of the Ferrandaise type had long been known in the northern part of the region of Auvergne (now part of Auvergne-Rhône-Alpes), the name "Ferrandaise" only came into use in the second half of the nineteenth century; before that, they were known as the race bigarrée, or roughly "the mottled breed". In the later part of the century the variability of the coat of the Ferrandaise was seen as a defect, and from 1899 the only permitted coat colour was pied red-and-white. A herdbook was established six years later, in 1905. The breed was mainly concentrated in two areas, around Clermont-Ferrand (for which it is named) and around Ambert, both in the département of Puy-de-Dôme, but its range extended into the Loire and the Haute-Loire to the south and east, and into the Corrèze to the west.

In the first quarter of the twentieth century the Ferrandaise numbered some 200 000 head. From around 1960 the Ferrandaise was cross-bred to some extent with Montbéliarde and Salers cattle. By 1962 the population had fallen to 42 000, and fifteen years later, in 1977, fewer than 170 remained. By 2001 numbers had increased to some 500 registered females, with frozen semen held from about 26 bulls. The Ferrandaise was listed by the FAO as "endangered-maintained" in 2007; in that year there were 1236 cows and about 50 bulls in  186 farms, with about 30 other bulls available for artificial insemination. In 2014 the total population was reported to be 1939.

Characteristics 

The Ferrandaise is large, solid and robust. It is docile, long-lived, frugal and resistant, and calves easily. It is well adapted to rough and poor terrain, and in particular to the soil and climatic conditions of the mountains of its native area.

The coat is normally red-and-white, or occasionally black-and-white. Three coat patterns are detailed in the breed standard: barrée, pied, with patches of white on a coloured ground; poudrée, white speckled with colour on the head and flanks; and bregniée, colour-sided. The muzzle and mucosa are pale, the horns lyre-shaped.

Use 

The Ferrandaise was traditionally a triple-purpose breed, kept for its milk, for its meat, and for draught work.

The Ferrandaise is now raised as a dual-purpose breed, for milk and meat.

References 

Cattle breeds originating in France
Cattle breeds